The 1931 Buffalo Bulls football team was an American football team that represented the University at Buffalo as an independent during the 1931 college football season. In its first season under head coach William Pritchard, the Bulls compiled a 2–6 record and were outscored by a total of 171 to 65. The team played its home games at Rotary Field in Buffalo, New York.

Schedule

References

Bufflao Bulls
Buffalo Bulls football seasons
Buffalo Bulls football